SS Experiment Camp (also known as SS Experiment Love Camp; original release title: Lager SSadis Kastrat Kommandantur) is a 1976 Nazi exploitation film directed by Sergio Garrone. The plot concerns non-consensual sexual experimenting with female prisoners of a concentration camp run by Colonel von Kleiben (Giorgio Cerioni), a Nazi officer who needs a testicle transplant after being castrated by a Russian girl. It gained infamy in the 1980s for its controversial themes and a public advertising campaign that involved obscene, suggestive posters. The film was banned in some countries, including the United Kingdom, where the film was subject to prosecution as one of the films known as "video nasties"; a title used in the press and by campaigners that came to be used for a list of films that could be found obscene under the Obscene Publications Act.

Cast
Mircha Carven as Helmut 
Giorgio Cerioni as Col. Von Kleiben 
Paola Corazzi as Mirelle 
Giovanna Mainardi as  
Serafino Profumo as The Sergeant
Attilio Dottesio as Dr. Steiner
Patrizia Melega  Dr. Renke
Almina De Sanzio 
Matilde Dall'Aglio as    
Agnes Kalpagos as Margot

Controversy
Bizarre Magazine, in a 2004 overview of the Naziploitation genre, said the following: "Its advertising campaign, an image of a semi-naked woman hanging upside-down from a crucifix, was instrumental in bringing unwanted attention to the Nasties, although, beyond that, its infamy is unwarranted". A similar view of it was taken by the British Board of Film Classification, who passed it uncut the next year, noting "Despite the questionable taste of basing an exploitation film in a concentration camp, the sexual activity itself was consensual and the level of potentially eroticised violence sufficiently limited".

However, it was denounced in by the Sunday Times and Sunday Express at the time of Holocaust Memorial Day, and cited by MPs Julian Brazier and Keith Vaz as part of their attempts to tighten the film banning system.

References

External links 
 
 SS Experiment Camp at Variety Distribution

1976 films
Italian sexploitation films
1970s Italian-language films
Italian thriller films
1970s thriller films
Nazi exploitation films
Obscenity controversies in film
Video nasties
Films scored by Roberto Pregadio
1970s Italian films